Jim Shockey (born 1957) is a Canadian outdoor writer, a professional big game outfitter and television producer and host for many hunting shows. Shockey is the former producer and host of Jim Shockey's Hunting Adventures and Jim Shockey's Uncharted on Outdoor Channel and Jim Shockey's The Professionals on Outdoor Channel and Sportsman Channel. He is a retired member of the Canadian Armed Forces (CAF), serving the rank Honorary Lieutenant-Colonel (HLCol) of the 4th Canadian Ranger Patrol Group.<ref>"Honoraries" , Canadian Army.</ref> His hunting adventures have spanned six continents and 50 countries. Shockey has been called by Outdoor Life magazine "the most accomplished big-game hunter of the modern era, having taken arguably the most free-range big game species by any living hunter." They also noted that he is "the most influential celebrity in big-game hunting."

 Life history 
Shockey was born in Saskatoon, Saskatchewan. Shockey was formerly an All-American swimmer in university and later played on the National waterpolo team for six years. Shockey participated in both the 1978 and 1982 world championships but did not attend the 1980 Olympics because of the international boycott against Russia. Shockey is considered to be one of the world's foremost experts on the Ethnocentric Folk Art forms from Western Canada and is an avid collector of Tribal art and artifacts from around the world. His collections have appeared several times in publications such as Country Living and Century Home. Shockey got married in the early 1980s to Louise, who was an actress, and the couple have two children. Branlin and Eva Shockey have both joined Shockey in his hunting and entertainment business.

 Professional career 
Shockey is a member of the Pro Staff or a brand ambassador for Leupold Optics, Stealth Cam, Nosler, Crosman/Benjamin, Yeti Coolers, Christensen Arms, and a partner of Bowtech. In May 2016, Shockey become the co-founding partner of BookYourHunt.com, an online marketplace for hunting trips, claiming that the company’s “focus on transparency and ethical hunting” and the novel approach to connecting outfitters with hunters was “something that will benefit the hunting industry for years to come.” 

Television series
Shockey hosted three TV series that appear on outdoor lifestyle TV networks Outdoor Channel and Sportsman Channel, Jim Shockey's Hunting Adventures, Jim Shockey's UNCHARTED, and Jim Shockey's The Professionals. His daughter, Eva Shockey, acted as co-host on Jim Shockey's Hunting Adventures''.

Between 2009 and 2015, Shockey won 15 awards at the annual Outdoor Channel "Golden Moose" Awards and won one award at Sportsman Channel's "Sportsman Choice" Awards of 2014.

In 2016, the two networks joined forces and hosted the "Outdoor Sportsman Awards" ceremony, and in 2017 Shockey won the "Outdoor Sportsman Awards" for Best Overall TV Series. In 2018, he was bestowed two Fan Favorite awards for Uncharted: Best Big Game Hunting Series and Best Education/Entertainment Series. In 2019, Shockey was honored with an award for Best Sound Design for Hunting Adventures and Fan Favorite Best Big Game Hunting Series for Uncharted.

Awards 
Shockey has received numerous accolades for his work in the outdoors. From Safari Club International he won the Fourth Pinnacle of Achievement Award in 2008; the Zenith Award, Crowning Achievement Award, Professional Hunter Award and the C.J. McElroy Award in 2009; the World Hunting Award in 2010; and was named International Hunter of the Year and received the World Conservation & Hunting Award in 2012.  In 2016, he received the Conklin Award, which recognizes the world's greatest active hunter who pursues game in the most difficult terrain and conditions while abiding by the highest standards of ethics and fair chase. In 2018, Shockey was awarded the Ovis Award, the top award of GSCO which "recognizes individuals who have had an overwhelming passion for hunting the mountains and doing so in fair chase and with total integrity." Shockey was named winner of the 2018 Weatherby Hunting and Conservation Award, bestowed upon those that have ethically taken the most varied, difficult, and largest number of species in the world.

References

1957 births
Living people
Canadian hunters
Sportspeople from Saskatoon